The Bell Sensplex is a four-pad ice facility, located in Ottawa, Ontario, Canada. It is the primary practice facility of the Ottawa Senators NHL team. In a partnership with the city of Ottawa, it is also used for minor hockey and hosts the annual Bell Capital Cup ice hockey tournament. The Sensplex is located at 1565 Maple Grove Road in the former city of Kanata. It was also the home arena for the Ottawa Lady Senators of the Canadian Women's Hockey League.

History
The facility contains three NHL-sized ice rinks, one Olympic-size ice rink and an indoor fieldhouse in its  building. The City of Ottawa provided $1.4 million of the cost to facilitate the construction. The Sensplex ultimately used only $800,000 of the City's funds. The Sensplex opened in December 2004.

Usage
It is used for Senators team practices, minor hockey and short track speed skating. The City of Ottawa buys 2,400 hours of ice time for public use annually. The facility is the main arena for the annual Bell Capital Cup, open to Atom (9-11) and Pee-Wee (11-13) age group teams, held between Christmas Day and New Year's. The tournament attracts over 500 teams annually and bills itself as "the world's largest hockey tournament."

References

External links
 Sensplex

Indoor ice hockey venues in Ontario
Ottawa Senators
Sports venues in Ottawa
National Hockey League practice facilities
Public–private partnership projects in Canada
2004 establishments in Ontario
Sports venues completed in 2004